The following highways are numbered 808:

United States

Canada
 Ontario Highway 808